Jerry Michael Heard (born May 1, 1947) is an American professional golfer who won several PGA Tour events in the 1970s.

Early life 
Heard was born in Visalia, California. He attended Fresno State College (now Fresno State University) for a short while.

Professional career 
Heard turned professional in 1968 and joined the PGA Tour in 1969. His first professional win came in the American Golf Classic at Firestone Country Club in Akron, Ohio in 1971. He finished with a four-day total of 275, three strokes better than runner-up Dale Douglass. In 1972, he won the Florida Citrus Open and the Colonial National Invitation. Heard had nearly 60 top-10 finishes in PGA Tour events in his career including four top-10 finishes in major championships — his best finish in a major was T-5 at the 1972 Masters Tournament. Heard was struck by lightning at the 1975 Western Open, along with playing partner Lee Trevino. Three others were also struck: Bobby Nichols, Jim Ahern, and Tony Jacklin.

Heard left the Tour in 1980, and today owns and operates a golf school, the Jerry Heard Golf Academy located at the Silverthorn Country Club in Spring Hill, Florida. His school had been located for many years in southwest Florida – in the Fort Myers area where he now lives.

Professional wins (8)

PGA Tour wins (5)

PGA Tour playoff record (0–1)

European Tour wins (1)

Other wins (2)
1968 Northern California Open
1971 Garden City Classic

Results in major championships

CUT = missed the half-way cut
"T" indicates a tie for a place

Summary

Most consecutive cuts made – 12 (1971 PGA – 1974 U.S. Open)
Longest streak of top-10s – 1 (four times)

See also 

 Fall 1968 PGA Tour Qualifying School graduates

References

External links

American male golfers
Fresno State Bulldogs men's golfers
PGA Tour golfers
PGA Tour Champions golfers
Golfers from California
People from Visalia, California
1947 births
Living people